Fodina contigua is a moth in the family Erebidae first described by Wileman in 1914. It is found in Taiwan.

The wingspan is 38–41 mm.

References

Moths described in 1914
Calpinae